Ayacucho District is one of fifteen districts of the province Huamanga in Peru.

Authorities

Mayors 
 2019-2022: Yuri Alberto Gutiérrez Gutiérrez.
 2015-2018: Germán Salvador Martinelli Chuchon.

Festivities

See also 
 Qunchupata
 Wichqana

References